Additive color or additive mixing is a property of a color model that predicts the appearance of colors made by coincident component lights, i.e. the perceived color can be predicted by summing the numeric representations of the component colors. Modern formulations of Grassmann's laws describe the additivity in the color perception of light mixtures in terms of algebraic equations. Additive color predicts perception and not any sort of change in the photons of light themselves. These predictions are only applicable in the limited scope of color matching experiments where viewers match small patches of uniform color isolated against a grey or black background.

Additive color models are applied in the design and testing of electronic displays that are used to render realistic images containing diverse sets of color using phosphors that emit light of a limited set of primary colors. Examination with a sufficiently powerful magnifying lens will reveal that each pixel in CRT, LCD, and most other types of color video displays is composed of red, green, and blue light-emitting phosphors which appear as a variety of single colors when viewed from a normal distance.

Additive color, alone, does not predict the appearance of mixtures of printed color inks, dye layers in color photographs on film, or paint mixtures. Instead, subtractive color is used to model the appearance of pigments or dyes, such as those in paints, inks.

The combination of two of the common three additive primary colors in equal proportions produces an additive secondary color—cyan, magenta or yellow.  Additive color is also used to predict colors from overlapping projected colored lights often used in theatrical lighting for plays, concerts, circus shows, and night clubs.

The full gamut of color available in any additive color system is defined by all the possible combinations of all the possible luminosities of each primary color in that system.  In chromaticity space, a gamut is a plane convex polygon with corners at the primaries. For three primaries, it is a triangle.

History

Systems of additive color are motivated by the Young–Helmholtz theory of trichromatic color vision, which was articulated around 1850 by Hermann von Helmholtz, based on earlier work by Thomas Young.  For his experimental work on the subject, James Clerk Maxwell is sometimes credited as being the father of additive color. He had the photographer Thomas Sutton photograph a tartan ribbon on black-and-white film three times, first with a red, then green, then blue color filter over the lens. The three black-and-white images were developed and then projected onto a screen with three different projectors, each equipped with the corresponding red, green, or blue color filter used to take its image. When brought into alignment, the three images (a black-and-red image, a black-and-green image and a black-and-blue image) formed a full-color image, thus demonstrating the principles of additive color.

See also

 Color mixing
 Color space
 Color theory
 Color motion picture film
 Kinemacolor
 Prizma Color
 RGB color model
 Subtractive color
 Technicolor
 William Friese-Greene

References

External links
RGB and CMYK Colour systems. 
http://www.edinphoto.org.uk/1_P/1_photographers_maxwell.htm - Photos and stories from the James Clerk Maxwell Foundation.
 Stanford University CS 178 interactive Flash demo  comparing additive and subtractive color mixing.

Color space
Color